The 2012 New Mexico Lobos football team represented the University of New Mexico in the 2012 NCAA Division I FBS football season. The Lobos were led by first-year head coach Bob Davie.  They played their home games at University Stadium and were members of the Mountain West Conference. They finished the season 4–9, 1–7 in Mountain West play to finish in a tie for ninth place.

Schedule

Game summaries

Southern

at Texas

at Texas Tech

at New Mexico State

Boise State

Texas State

at Hawaii

at Air Force

Fresno State

at UNLV

Wyoming

Nevada

at Colorado State

References

New Mexico
New Mexico Lobos football seasons
New Mexico Lobos football